The  Sindhi language  has a long history of arts, literature, and culture. The first Sindhi newspaper was Sind Sudhar, founded in 1884. Sindhi language newspapers played a vital role for Independence in 1947; In 1920, Al-Wahid newspaper published by Haji Abdullah Haroon in Karachi.

Sindhi newspapers in Pakistan
Following is a list of Sindhi newspapers from Sindh in Pakistan.

See also
List of newspapers in Pakistan

References

External links
Member Publications, All Pakistan Newspapers Society (APNS)
Pakistan newspapers, paksindh.com
Sindhi newspapers

Sindhi
List
Lists of mass media in Pakistan
Sindhi
Sindhi-language mass media